Margery Mason (27 September 1913 – 26 January 2014) was an English actress and director. She was the artistic director of the Repertory Theatre in Bangor, County Down, Northern Ireland in the 1960s.

Career 
Mason played Sarah Stevens, the mother in John Hopkins' four-play cycle Talking to a Stranger (1966). A family drama with four characters, the viewpoint of Sarah Stevens was depicted in the fourth play, The Innocent Must Suffer. Her film roles included Charlie Bubbles (1968), Clegg (1970), The Raging Moon (1971), Made (1972), Hennessy (1975), the bullying teacher's wife in Pink Floyd – The Wall (1982), Terry on the Fence (1986), a game show contestant in Victoria Wood Presents (1989), 101 Dalmatians (1996), Love Actually (2003), and the lady who works the sweets trolley in Harry Potter and the Goblet of Fire (2005). She played "The Ancient Booer" in the 1987 film The Princess Bride. Her television roles include appearances on Midsomer Murders, Peak Practice and Juliet Bravo (1982) (Series 1, Ep. 8). She played Mrs Porter in the Granada TV series A Family at War during 1970–71.

Personal life 
Mason learned to scuba dive and received her diving certificate at the age of 81. Her farewell to the stage came in 2003 at the age of 90. She loved to travel and had been a keen horsewoman and tennis player. Until she was 99, she swam five times a week at the Swiss Cottage baths.

Death
She died on 26 January 2014 peacefully from natural causes at her home in Swiss Cottage.

Filmography

References

External links

1913 births
2014 deaths
20th-century English actresses
Actresses from London
English centenarians
English film actresses
English television actresses
English theatre directors
People from Hackney Central
21st-century English actresses
Women centenarians